Llallawi (Quechua for a very big potato of singular appearance which used to be elected as a sacrificial offering for divinities, hispanicized spelling Llallahue) is a mountain in the Andes of Peru, about  high. It is located in the Arequipa Region, Castilla Province, Andagua District. Llallawi lies west of Wakapallqa and southeast of Usqullu.

References 

Mountains of Peru
Mountains of Arequipa Region